Valley Ridge (formerly known as SnOasis) is a proposed ski and sports resort in Great Blakenham near Ipswich, Suffolk, England, planned to open in 2024.  As of March 2021, the plan is for a £500 million investment based around a 180-metre ski slope and a water park.

Plans submitted in 2004 were approved in 2008, and after no work had started were renewed in April 2020, but substantially altered plans were released less than a year later.  The approved plans include a 415 metre long slope which would have become the largest real snow indoor ski slope in the world, along with a casino and nightclub,  and were opposed by local groups.

As of August 2021, the plans are in jeopardy because of a conflicting plan for extension of a nearby landfill site.

History
The site's history as a proposed ski centre goes back to 2001, when it was acquired by Onslow Suffolk Ltd, and planning permission was applied for in 2004. Local planning permission for the project was granted on 21 April 2006 and public inquiry was announced on 26 July 2006 which upheld the decision, subject to conditions. Final government approval was granted by Hazel Blears on 6 November 2008 concluding that all the conditions had been met. After a lengthy process, in April 2020 Mid Suffolk District Council approved the Snoasis development to proceed.

Later that year, the project was relaunched under new management with the name Valley Ridge, and in March 2021, they launched a major consultation exercise with new plans, reconfigured as a holiday park orientated towards family groups, with self-catering accommodation, a 450-bed hotel, indoor winter sports facilities, outdoor pursuits and retail and catering outlets.

Some 975,000 visitors are expected per year, of which 428,000 will be overnight visitors.  There will be up to 2500 parking spaces, with around 1500-1600 of those spaces for the overnight visitors.

The developers estimate that the scheme will create 1800 direct jobs.

In August 2021, the developers threatened to withdraw their plans if a neighbouring landfill site were to be successful in extending its licence from 2022 until 2035.  Because that decision rests with the county council, with the holiday village being a decision within the remit of the district council, the district council has asked the Ministry of Housing, Communities and Local Government to intervene.

Opposition

Traffic
Concern was expressed by some local residents over potential traffic congestion. They stated that the traffic modelling at the Copdock Roundabout was unrealistic and was based on only 737,000 visitors in first year and 825,000 in the second without sufficient sensitivity testing for higher traffic levels. They also expressed concern about the potential for traffic from the south to 'rat run' through Sproughton saying this had not been considered.  The developers offered in 2010 to pay for improvements to the Copdock intersection of the A12 and A14.

Biodiversity
Part of the site is in a Special Landscape Area designated a County Wildlife Site by Suffolk Wildlife Trust and protected great crested newts and badgers would have had to be moved as part of the planning agreement. The Suffolk Wildlife Trust objected on the basis that there would be a "significant loss to biodiversity".  Natural England objected from the start saying that insufficient measures to protect great crested newts on the site.

Damage to the rural nature of the area

Climate change
The former developers claimed that 75% of their energy will come from renewable sources including a large-scale woodchip burner and a proposed "energy from waste" incinerator on land adjacent to the site was also proposed  and they also plan to plant 130,000 trees to act as a carbon sink.

References

External links 
Official site
Official site
BBC Suffolk report on 2021 plans
BBC Mark Murphy breakfast show interview (at 1:13:00)
Former plans:  Mid Suffolk District Council Planning site
Should SnOasis be built? BBC Suffolk  - opinions on the former Snoasis project

Tourist attractions in Suffolk
Indoor ski resorts
Ski areas and resorts in England
Buildings and structures in Suffolk
Proposed buildings and structures in England